Independence Day (Bosnian, Croatian and Serbian: Dan nezavisnosti, Cyrillic: Дан независности) is a public holiday observed in Federation of Bosnia and Herzegovina held on 1 March to celebrate the independence of the then Republic of Bosnia and Herzegovina from the Socialist Federal Republic of Yugoslavia in 1992. It is not observed in Republika Srpska, the other political entity of Bosnia and Herzegovina.

History 
Citizens of the Socialist Republic of Bosnia and Herzegovina, a constituent federal state of the Socialist Federal Republic of Yugoslavia, voted in an independence referendum held between 28 February and 1 March 1992. The referendum question was: "Are you in favor of a sovereign and independent Bosnia-Herzegovina, a state of equal citizens and nations of Muslims, Serbs, Croats and others who live in it?" Independence was strongly favoured by Bosniaks and Bosnian Croat voters, while majority of Bosnian Serbs boycotted it. Voter turnout was 63.6 percent, of whom 99.7 percent voted for the independence.

The results of the referendum were accepted on 6 March by the Parliament of Bosnia and Herzegovina. On 7 April 1992, the European Community recognized Bosnia and Herzegovina as an independent state. The Parliament of the Federation of Bosnia and Herzegovina (the parliament of the Bosnian–Croat Federation) decided on 28 February 1995 that 1 March would be the Independence Day of Bosnia and Herzegovina and a national holiday. Independence Day was celebrated for the first time on 1 March 1995.

Observance 
The Independence Day of Bosnia and Herzegovina is celebrated only in the Federation of Bosnia and Herzegovina, while Republika Srpska boycotts this holiday and celebrates its own Independence Day on 9 January. Milorad Dodik, former President of Republika Srpska and current Bosnian Presidency member, has claimed that Independence Day "is a holiday of the Bosniak people and we do not dispute it, but it is not a holiday celebrated in the Republika Srpska (RS)". Most Bosnian Serbs instead associate the date with the 1 March 1992 attack on a Serb wedding procession in Sarajevo which resulted in the death of the groom's father and the wounding of a Serbian Orthodox priest, whom most Bosnian Serbs consider to have been the first casualties of the Bosnian War.

References

Citation

Sources

March observances
Bosnia and Herzegovina culture
1995 establishments in Bosnia and Herzegovina
Bosnia and Herzegovina